Jamal al-Din Aqqush al-Afram al-Mansuri (died 1336) was a high-ranking Mamluk emir and defector, who served as the Mamluk viceroy of Damascus and later the Ilkhanid governor of Hamadan.

Mamluk emir
Aqqush al-Afram was an ethnic Circassian and began his career as a mamluk (slave soldier) of Sultan Qalawun in the Mansuriyya corps. He was the governor of al-Karak, the desert fortress capital of a province spanning much of Transjordan.

Viceroy of Damascus
On 25 February 1299 Aqqush was promoted as viceroy of Damascus. This followed the defection of his predecessor there, Qibjak, to the Baghdad-based Mongol Ilkhanate. Aqqush held office until 1309. He was commended by the historian al-Safadi for his valor, strategic planning against Ilkhanid offensives, care for the poor in his jurisdiction and hunting skills. Aqqush was highly regarded by the people of Damascus, particularly for his battlefield reputation, and often adorned their clothes or weapons with his heraldic symbols. He wielded considerable power within the province, appointing officials unilaterally and only informing the central government in Cairo afterward. At the time, Mamluk strongmen, namely the emirs Salar and Baybars al-Jashnakir, held the reins of power, the sultan al-Nasir Muhammad playing a largely ceremonial role. Aqqush considered himself equals to Baybars and Salar and once remarked that were it not for his "ablaq palace, green square, and beautiful river [in Damascus], I would not have left them alone to rejoice in the kingship of Egypt [capital of the sultanate]". 

Viewing himself of high stature, he attempted to marry the Ilkhanid princess El Qutlugh Khatun during his rule over Damascus, as marrying into Mongol royalty was rare and considered prestigious. She rebuffed his entreaties, however, and it is not mentioned in the sources that he married a Mongol woman.

Defection to the Ilkhanate
Aqqush fled the Mamluk realm with his father-in-law Aydamur al-Zardakash and the high-ranking emir Qarasunqur in 1312 due to fears of punishment by Sultan al-Nasir Muhammad. The latter had returned to power for the third time and rumors of his ill disposal toward Aqqush and Qarasunqur had reached the two emirs. They were welcomed by the Ilkhanid khan Oljeitu, who appointed Aqqush governor of Hamadan. Aqqush served the post until his death in 1336.

Aqqush and Qarasunqur encouraged the last major Ilkhanid offensive against Mamluk Syria, which was the failed siege of the Euphrates fortress of al-Rahba in 1313.

References

Bibliography

1336 deaths

Year of birth unknown
Mamluk emirs
Bahri dynasty
Circassian Mamluks
Defectors
Officials of the Ilkhanate
Mamluk viceroys of Damascus
14th-century Kipchaks